A–Ronne is a tape composition for five voice actors by the Italian composer Luciano Berio.

Composed in June 1974 and arranged in 1975 for unaccompanied vocal ensemble, the work is partly a setting of words by the Italian avant-garde poet Edoardo Sanguineti. Berio elaborates Sanguineti's work with extracts from and allusions to a host of other texts, including various translations of The Bible (St. John's Gospel), works by Dante (The Divine Comedy), Goethe (Faust), Karl Marx and Friedrich Engels (The Communist Manifesto), T.S. Eliot ("East Coker" from Four Quartets), James Joyce (Finnegans Wake), Samuel Beckett (Endgame), Roland Barthes (an essay on Georges Bataille) and also correspondence between Sanguineti and the composer. The title of the piece is an extension of the term "from A to Z": in the old Italian alphabet the three signs ette, conne, ronne came after z. 

Berio employs a wide range of vocalisations, from sung phrases borrowed from Dutch folksongs to direct speech at various pitches and wordless intonations and inflexions. Although Sanguineti's poem is repeated several times throughout, it is usually indiscernible amongst the variety of textures. As such, Berio described the work as a "documentary on a poem by Edoardo Sanguineti, as one would say a documentary on a painting or an exotic country". He also described it as a "theatre of the ear" in the style of late sixteenth-century Italian madrigal singing. Also available on BMG (RCA Victrola CD 09026-68302-2).

The work is divided into six untitled sections. It was commissioned by Dutch Radio KRO as a tape composition for five voice actors, three male and two female. It lasts 31:20. The 1975 arrangement was premiered by Swingle II who recorded it for Decca Records in London in 1975.

References

Further reading
 Berio, Luciano. 1991. "A–Ronne". In Musica senza aggettivi: Studi per Fedele d'Amico, edited by A. Ziino, 2: 815-824. Florence: Olschke. .
 De Santis, Mila. 2012. "Organizzare il significato di un testo: Aspetti del rapporto musica/parola nell'opera di Luciano Berio". In Luciano Berio: Nuove prospettive/New perspectives, edited by Angela Ida De Benedictis, introduction by Talia Pecker Berio, 237–66. Siena: Accademia Musicale Chigiana. .
 Feuillerac, Martin. 2012. "Multiple Layers of Meaning(s) in Luciano Berio's A–Ronne". In Dzieło muzyczne jako znak. VIII,  edited by Anna Nowak, 187–98. Praca Zbiorowa 34. Bydgoszcz: Wydawnictwo Uczelniane Akademii Muzycznej im. F. Nowowiejskiego. .
 Horvath, Nina. 2009. "The 'Theatre of the Ear': Analyzing Berio's Musical Documentary A–ronne". Musicological Explorations 10 (Spring): 73–104.
 Nonnenmann, Rainer. 2009. "Im Anfang war das Wort...: Die Entdeckung von Sprache als Musik im 20. Jahrhundert". Musik & Ästhetik 13, no. 49 (January): 39–54.
 Osmond-Smith, David. 2012. "Voicing the Labyrinth: The Collaborations of Edoardo Sanguineti and Luciano Berio". Twentieth-century Music 9, nos. 1–2 (Music, Politics, Semiotics: Aspects of the Legacy of David Osmond-Smith (1946–2007)): 63–78.
 Sanguineti, Edoardo. "Quattro passaggi con Luciano". In Luciano Berio: Nuove prospettive/New perspectives, edited by Angela Ida De Benedictis, introduction by Talia Pecker Berio, 49–60. Siena: Accademia Musicale Chigiana. .
 Strobino, Enrico. 1998. "Intrecci di voci: Attraversare i linguaggi". Musica domani: Trimestrale di cultura e pedagogia musicale—organo della Società Italiana per l'Educazione Musicale 28, no. 109 (December) 20–24.

External Links

Luciano Berio's A-Ronne This page details the composition of A-Ronne and analyzes the literary allusions in the Sanguineti poem.

Compositions by Luciano Berio
Vocal musical compositions
1975 compositions